Kwabena Boafo (born September 1, 1977) is a Ghanaian football player who played for Hearts of Oak.

Career
Boafo began his career at Sekondi Hasaacas in 1997. He joined Hearts of Oak in 2001, where he later became the team captain.

International
Boafo played his only game for the Ghana national football team in 2005.

References

External links
 

1977 births
Living people
Ghanaian footballers
Ghana international footballers
Accra Hearts of Oak S.C. players
Association football defenders